Raymond James Hannigan (July 14, 1927 — July 18, 2020) was a Canadian professional ice hockey right winger. He played 3 games for the Toronto Maple Leafs of the National Hockey League during the 1948–49 season. The rest of his career, which lasted from 1947 to 1955, was spent in the minor leagues. His brothers, Pat and Gord, also played professional hockey.

Hannigan was ordained in 1991 as a Catholic priest and later lived in the United States. He died in Mesa, Arizona on July 18, 2020.

Career statistics

Regular season and playoffs

References

External links
 

1927 births
2020 deaths
Canadian ice hockey right wingers
Edmonton Flyers (WHL) players
Edmonton Oil Kings (WCHL) players
Ice hockey people from Ontario
Ontario Hockey Association Senior A League (1890–1979) players
Pittsburgh Hornets players
St. Michael's Buzzers players
Sportspeople from Timmins
Toronto Maple Leafs players
Toronto Marlboros players
Toronto St. Michael's Majors players